is an autobahn in eastern Germany. It is one of the original Reichsautobahns and connected Breslau to Berlin, via Wrocław (Breslau) and Görlitz. It connects Germany and Poland. A 15 is part of European route E36.

History

The A 15 was initially planned as a Reichsautobahn Berlin - Wrocław - Upper Silesia, and was completed until the beginning of the war, one lane to Wrocław. Until the reunification, only a few lanes (south side) to a few hundred metres as the three-way junction (Dreieck) Spreewald. In the GDR, the highway was internally named A 5. As a peculiarity of the route, many bridges are destroyed in the World War II. Those were restored in the GDR. The Spreebrücke near the junction of South Cottbus, was restored in the northern side. In this area, the road was then pivoted. The Spreewald junction was completed in 1962. Until then, the traffic to and from the A 13 in the direction of Berlin, on the opposite direction on the ramps. During the 1990s, the north side of the highway was gradually built. The first completed section was three kilometres from the triangle Spreewald. In the course of construction work, the traffic had to be regulated by traffic light. Before the reunification, at the AVUS in Berlin (West), was gradually named A 15. After the reunification, it was renumbered A 115.

During the construction work on the 8 April 2016, an apparent bomb from the World War II was initially discovered. In an abundance of caution, the A 15 was cordoned off from both sides. It turned out it was not a bomb, but a metal pipe.

Exit list 

 

 
 
 

 

 

| - DK18 
|}

References

External links 

15
A015